The 2015–16 New York Riveters season was the first in franchise history and the National Women's Hockey League's inaugural season.

Offseason

Spring free agent camp
During May 2015, all four teams held player evaluation camps for free agents. The list of players that attended the Riveters evaluation camp on May 23 and 24 were split into Team Red and Team White.
Team Red

Team White

Regular season

News and notes
 Meghan Fardelmann scored the first hat trick in Riveters history in a December 27 match against the Buffalo Beauts.
 On December 31, 2015, Fardelman was one of two Riveters players (including Bray Ketchum) that were loaned to the Boston Pride. The two donned the Pride jerseys for one day and participated in the 2015 Women's Winter Classic, the first outdoor professional women’s hockey game.

Standings

Game log

|- style="background:#fcc;"
| 1 || October 11 || @ Connecticut Whale || 1–4 || || Fujimoto || Chelsea Piers CT || 0–1–0 || 0 || 
|- style="background:#fcc;"
| 2 || October 18 || Boston Pride || 7–1 || || Lundberg || Aviator Sports and Events Center || 0–2–0 || 0 || 
|- style="background:#fcc;"
| 3 || October 25 || Connecticut Whale || 3–1 || || Fujimoto || Aviator Sports and Events Center || 0–3–0 || 0 || 
|- style="background:#cfc;"
| 4 || November 15 || Boston Pride || 2–3 || || Fujimoto || Aviator Sports and Events Center || 1–3–0 || 2 || 
|- style="background:#cfc;"
| 5 || November 22 || @ Boston Pride || 3–2 || || Fujimoto || Bright Hockey Center || 2–3–0 || 4 || 
|- style="background:#fcc;"
| 6 || November 29 || Buffalo Beauts || 3–1 || || Fujimoto || Aviator Sports and Events Center || 2–4–0 || 4 || 
|- style="background:#fcc;"
| 7 || December 6 || @ Boston Pride || 1–4 || || Scrivens || Bright Hockey Center || 2–5–0 || 4 || 
|- style="background:#fff;"
| 8 || December 13 || Connecticut Whale || 4–3 || SO || Scrivens || Aviator Sports and Events Center || 2–5–1 || 5 || 
|- style="background:#cfc;"
| 9 || December 27 || @ Buffalo Beauts || 7–3 || || Fujimoto || HarborCenter || 3–5–1 || 7 || 
|- style="background:#fcc;"
| 10 || January 3 || Connecticut Whale || 6–1 || || Fujimoto || Aviator Sports and Events Center || 3–6–1 || 7 || 
|- style="background:#fcc;"
| 11 || January 9 || @ Connecticut Whale || 3–4 || || Fujimoto || Ingalls Rink || 3–7–1 || 7 || 
|- style="background:#fcc;"
| 12 || January 10 || @ Boston Pride || 1–8 || || Scrivens || Bright Hockey Center || 3–8–1 || 7 || 
|- style="background:#fff;"
| 13 || January 17 || Buffalo Beauts || 6–5 || SO || Scrivens || Aviator Sports and Events Center || 3–8–2 || 8 || 
|- style="background:#fcc;"
| 14 || January 31 || @ Buffalo Beauts || 2–4 || || Fujimoto || HarborCenter || 3–9–2 || 8 || 
|- style="background:#fcc;"
| 15 || February 6 || Boston Pride || 6–1 || || Laden || Aviator Sports and Events Center || 3–10–2 || 8 || 
|- style="background:#cfc;"
| 16 || February 14 || Buffalo Beauts || 3–4 || SO || Fujimoto || Aviator Sports and Events Center || 4–10–2 || 10 || 
|- style="background:#fcc;"
| 17 || February 21 || @ Buffalo Beauts || 1-5 || || Fujimoto || HarborCenter || 4–11–2 || 10 || 
|- style="background:#fcc;"
| 18 || February 28 || @ Connecticut Whale || 2-4 || || Laden || Chelsea Piers CT || 4–12–2 || 10 || 
|-

|

Playoffs

Game log

|-  style="background:#fcc;"
| 1 || Mar 4 || @ Boston Pride || 0–6 || || Scrivens || Raymond Bourque Arena || 0–1 || 
|-  style="background:#fcc;"
| 2 || Mar 5 || @ Boston Pride || 4–7 || || Fujimoto || Raymond Bourque Arena || 0–2 || 
|-

|-
|

Statistics
Final

Skaters

Goaltenders

†Denotes player spent time with another team before joining the Riveters.  Stats reflect time with the Riveters only.
‡Denotes player was traded mid-season.  Stats reflect time with the Riveters only.

Roster
Updated January 31, 2016

|}

Awards and honors
NWHL Player of the Week
 Nana Fujimoto – November 15, 2015
 Meghan Fardelmann – December 29, 2015

NWHL 1st All-Star Game selection
Morgan Fritz-Ward (Team Pfalzer – Fan Vote)
Nana Fujimoto (Team Pfalzer)
Madison Packer (Team Knight – Fan Vote)
Janine Weber (Team Knight)

Transactions

Trades

Signings

Draft

The following were the Riveters selections in the 2015 NWHL Draft on June 20, 2015.

References

Games

2015–16 NWHL season by team
New York Riveters
New York Riveters
New York Riveters